Corporal Winthrop D. Putnam (September 18, 1837 – January 15, 1907) was an American soldier who fought in the American Civil War. Putnam received his country's highest award for bravery during combat, the Medal of Honor. Putnam's medal was won for his actions at the Battle of Vicksburg, Mississippi on July 2, 1863. He was honored with the award on April 4, 1898.

Putnam was born in Southbridge, Massachusetts, entered service in Peoria, Illinois, and was buried in Milwaukee, Wisconsin.

Medal of Honor citation

See also
List of American Civil War Medal of Honor recipients: M–P

References

1837 births
1907 deaths
American Civil War recipients of the Medal of Honor
People from Southbridge, Massachusetts
Union Army officers
United States Army Medal of Honor recipients
People of Illinois in the American Civil War
Burials in Wisconsin
Military personnel from Massachusetts